Justina Szilágyi de Horogszeg (before 1455 – 1497) was a Hungarian noblewoman, who became the second wife of Vlad Dracula, Voivode of Wallachia. She was the daughter of Ladislaus or Osvát Szilágyi and thus a cousin of Matthias Corvinus, King of Hungary. Corvinus first gave her in marriage to Wenceslas Pongrác of Szentmiklós. Pongrác had inherited estates in Upper Hungary (present-day Slovakia), but was forced to renounce them in exchange for landed property he and Justina jointly received in Transylvania following their marriage. After Pongrác died in 1474, the widowed Justina married Vlad, whom Corvinus acknowledged as the lawful voivode of Wallachia in 1475. Vlad seized Wallachia in late 1476, but soon died in battle. To strengthen her claim to her Transylvanian estates, she married Paul Suki, who was related to the former owners of those territories. After the death of Suki, in 1479, Justina was married to John Erdélyi of Somkerék, until her death in 1497.

Early life

Many details of Justina's early life are uncertain. In 1479, a royal charter referred to her as the daughter of Osvát Szilágyi, maternal uncle of Matthias Corvinus, King of Hungary. Seventeen years later, another document stated that Osvát's younger brother, Ladislaus, was her father. Accepting the credibility of the earlier document, historians András Kubinyi and Tamás Fedeles say Osvát Szilágyi and his wife, Ágota Pósa of Szer, were Justina's parents. On the other hand, historians Pál Engel and Mihai-Florin Hasan concluded that Justina was the daughter of Ladislaus and his unknown wife, in accordance with the 1496 document. Justina was born in the early 1450s, thus she was still an infant when Ladislaus Szilágyi died in 1454, according to Hasan. Hasan also proposes that Osvát Szilágyi was appointed her guardian, which gave rise to his erroneous identification as Justina's father.

Marriages

First marriage

Matthias Corvinus gave Justina into marriage to Wenceslas (also known as Ladislaus) Pongrác of Szentmiklós, a member of an influential noble family which owned estates in Upper Hungary (now Slovakia). Corvinus forced Pongrác to surrender the fortress of Sztrecsény (now Strečno) and the town of Zsolna (present-day Žilina), in exchange for Transylvanian estates, including Gernyeszeg (now Gornești in Romania), which had been confiscated from the Erdélyi of Somkerék and Suki families in 1467. Pongrác had been the sole owner of the estates in Upper Hungary, but the new Transylvanian estates were jointly owned by Pongrác and Justina. Pongrác died in 1474. Royal charters almost always referred to Justina as Pongrác's widow during the following years until her death.

Second marriage

Matthias Corvinus had Vlad the Impaler, Voivode of Wallachia, imprisoned for allegedly conducting secret negotiations with the Ottoman Empire in 1462, and only released him in early 1475. Fyodor Kuritsyn, who was the ambassador of Ivan III of Russia to Corvinus in the early 1480s, recorded that Corvinus had given his "sister" in marriage to Vlad and they had lived together for ten years. Hasan concluded that Kuritsyn obviously combined data about Vlad's two wives when writing his report. Vlad's first wife was most probably Corvinus' illegitimate sister, according to modern scholarly research, who died in either 1472 or 1473.

Vlad married Justina as his second wife after his release. Corvinus recognised Vlad, in 1475, as the lawful ruler of Wallachia, but he provided no support to Vlad in asserting his claim against Basarab Laiotă. Vlad acquired a house in Pécs, which soon became known as "Drakwlyaháza" ("Dracula's house"). It was mentioned in a deed issued by the Pécs Chapter on 10 September 1489, which also referred to "Justina, the widow of the late voivode Dragwlya".

Vlad invaded Wallachia with Hungarian and Moldavian support forcing Basarab Laiotă to flee to the Ottoman Empire, in November 1476. Shortly after he was installed as voivode, he asked the burghers of Brașov to send carpenters to Târgoviște where he wanted to build his new home. However, Basarab Laiotă returned and Vlad was murdered in late 1476 or early 1477.

Kuritsyn mentioned that Vlad had three sons. Hasan and Matei Cazacu proposed that Justina gave birth to Vlad's second son and namesake, who was the ancestor of the Hungarian noble Drakwla family. In contrast, Fedeles wrote that Vlad and Justina's marriage was childless.

Third and fourth marriages

In 1478, members of the Erdélyi of Somkerék family laid claim to Justina's castle at Gernyeszeg and the nearby villages. To secure her position, she married Paul Suki, a nephew of a one-time co-owner of the estate. She was first mentioned as Suki's wife on 26 January 1479, but he died in the same year giving rise to disputes between Justina and his relatives. About two years later, Justina married John Erdélyi of Somkerék. He survived Justina, who died sometime after 13 June 1497.

Ancestry

Notes

References

Sources

 
 
 
 
 

Justina
Royal consorts of Wallachia
Remarried royal consorts
15th-century Hungarian people
15th-century Romanian people
People of medieval Wallachia
15th-century Romanian women
15th-century Hungarian women
Vlad the Impaler